Geoff Cartwright is an actor, director, award-winning audio book reader, poet, author and high school teacher. Cartwright is notable for his recurring role as Dr. Rob Bowen in the Australian drama All Saints, and for his roles in White Collar Blue, Water Rats and Murder Call. In 1996 Cartwright won a TDK Australian Audio Book Award for his narration of Tim Winton's The Riders. Cartwright is also notable in the live theatre scene in both Brisbane and Sydney. Formerly an English & Drama teacher at a Catholic college on the Northern Beaches of Sydney, he was also the artistic director of the Rough Hewn Theatre Troupe, which called the Star of the Sea Theatre, Manly as its home. Geoff directed numerous Rough Hewn productions, offering a stepping stone opportunity to many young actors who have since studied at and graduated from prestigious drama schools in Australia and abroad. He now resides in Queensland.

Filmography

Films

External links
Geoff Cartwright on the Official TDK Australian Audio Book Awards Website

Australian male television actors
Living people
Year of birth missing (living people)